Yarali-ye Olya (also Romanized as Yār‘alī-ye ‘Olyā; also known as Yār‘alī-ye Bālā) is a village in Nurali Rural District, in the Central District of Delfan County, Lorestan Province, Iran. At the 2006 census, its population was 44, in 8 families.

References 

Towns and villages in Delfan County